Achilleion is an early Neolithic site in Thessaly, Greece. It was partly excavated by the American archaeologist Marija Gimbutas. Achilleion is a large site that is practically untouched by archaeologists which Gimbutas claims to be filled entirely with Neolithic debris and hundreds of Neolithic mounds. An excavation was planned because the dig was expected to have a high yield of artifacts and if successful would possibly provide proof of an earlier age of European Neolithic settlement then was previously known. Excavation was started because it was expected that they would find significant numbers of preceramic Neolithic remains. The work started by Marija Gimbutas was stopped because the dig failed to yield any significant findings, but Gimbutas claims that the dig was interrupted by the political unrest caused by the Cyprus conflict. 

Achilleion is located in modern-day Greece, in an area now known as Thessaly. Thessaly lies in northern Greece, just south of Macedonia. Thessaly is best known as a vacation spot, but it was also believed to be filled with artifacts that could give scientists important clues to past civilizations.

Excavation
The excavation was funded by UCLA in 1973 and 1974 during the months of August and September. The dig was also supported by the National Science Foundation and the Samuel H. Kress foundation. The dig team consisted of Marija Gimbutas leading the excavation along with 40 other students and scholars.

While the excavation was still in progress, there were four test pits dug each about 5 meters deep. Some useful things were recovered from the site; samples of preserved fauna, pottery, and 3 houses were discovered. Unfortunately, Gimbutas overlooked important details when reporting on her excavation, “No geologic, geomorphologic, sedimentologic, or pedologic study was carried out- a serious failing” (McPherron).

Sources
Claude Björk. Early pottery in Greece: a technological and functional analysis of the evidence from neolithic Achilleion, Thessaly. Jonsered, Sweden: P. Åströms V., 1995.
 Marija Gimbutas, Shan Winn, & Daniel Shimabuku, eds. Achilleion, a Neolithic settlement in Thessaly, Greece, 6400-5600 B.C. Los Angeles, Calif.: Institute of Archaeology, University of California, Los Angeles, 1989.
 Marija Gimbutas. “Achilleion: A Neolithic Mound in Thessaly; Preliminary Report on 1973 and 1974 Excavations”, Journal of Field Archaeology 1, no. 3/4 (1974): 277–302.
Alan McPherron. Review of Achilleion: A Neolithic Settlement in Thessaly, Greece, 6400-5600 BC by Marija Gimbutas, Shan Winn, Daniel Shimabuku, in American Antiquity 56, no. 3 (Jul 1991): 567–8.
Catherine Perlès. The early Neolithic in Greece: the first farming communities in Europe. Cambridge: Cambridge University Press, 2001.
“Thessaly”, Encyclopædia Britannica.

Former populated places in Greece
Neolithic settlements in Thessaly